Events from the year 1543 in France.

Incumbents
 Monarch – Francis I

Events

Siege of Nice

Births
 
18 February – Charles III, Duke of Lorraine (died 1608).

Full date missing
Louis Bellaud, writer (died 1588)
François de Bonne, Duke of Lesdiguières, military officer (died 1626)
Nicolas de Neufville, seigneur de Villeroy, secretary of state (died 1617)

Deaths

Full date missing
Jean Le Veneur, Roman Catholic cardinal
Philippe de Chabot, admiral (born c.1492)

See also

References

1540s in France